The Bolivia women's national football team represents Bolivia in international women's football and is controlled by the Federación Boliviana de Fútbol. Bolivia has never qualified for a World Cup and has been always eliminated in the Group Stage in the Sudamericano Femenino. Also, Bolivia's matches are always Sudamericano Femenino or Bolivarian Games, it has never played a friendly and has a lack of wins.

Team image

Nicknames
The Bolivia women's national football team has been known or nicknamed as the "".

Home stadium
Bolivia plays their home matches on the Estadio Hernando Siles.

Head-to-head record

 Counted for the FIFA A-level matches only.

Results and fixtures

The following is a list of match results in the last 12 months, as well as any future matches that have been scheduled.

Legend

2022

2023

Bolivia Results and Fixtures – Soccerway.com

Coaching staff

Current coaching staff

Manager history

Players

Current squad
 The following players were called up for the 2022 Copa América Femenina.
 Caps and goals accurate up to and including 24 February 2021.

Recent call-ups
 The following players have been called up a Bolivia squad in the past 12 months.

Note: Injury icons should not be used in rosters. They are excessively detailed and violates WP:RECENTISM and MOS:TEXTASIMAGES. See Wikipedia talk:WikiProject Football/Archive 41#Injury logo.

Captains

 Janeth Morón (?– )

Records

Players in bold are still active, at least at club level.

Most capped players

Top goalscorers

Competitive record

FIFA Women's World Cup

*Draws include knockout matches decided on penalty kicks.

Olympic Games

*Draws include knockout matches decided on penalty kicks.

CONMEBOL Copa América Femenina

*Draws include knockout matches decided on penalty kicks.

Pan American Games

*Draws include knockout matches decided on penalty kicks.

South American Games

*Draws include knockout matches decided on penalty kicks.

Bolivarian Games

*Draws include knockout matches decided on penalty kicks.

See also
 Sport in Bolivia
 Football in Bolivia
 Women's football in Bolivia
 Bolivia men's national football team

References

External links
 Official website
 FIFA profile

National
South American women's national association football teams
women